Faiz Baig (born 20 June 1956) is an Indian former cricketer. He played eighteen first-class matches for Hyderabad between 1980 and 1984.

See also
 List of Hyderabad cricketers

References

External links
 

1956 births
Living people
Indian cricketers
Hyderabad cricketers
Place of birth missing (living people)